Sokolovsky may refer to:

People
Sokolovsky (surname), including a list of people with the name

Geography
Sokolovsky District, name of Lazovsky District, Primorsky Krai, Russia, in 1941–1949
Sokolovsky (rural locality) (Sokolovskaya, Sokolovskoye), name of several rural localities in Russia

See also
Sokol (disambiguation)
Sokolov (disambiguation)
Sokolovo (disambiguation)
Sakalauskas